Martha Copp is an American sociologist. She is a professor in the Department of Sociology and Anthropology at East Tennessee State University (ETSU). She is known for her work on symbolic interactionism, emotion management theory, and on teaching fieldwork to students.

Selected publications

References

External links
 Faculty webpage

Year of birth missing (living people)
Living people
American women social scientists
East Tennessee State University faculty
American women academics
21st-century American women